Georgios Poulopoulos (born 28 June 1975) is a Greek footballer who plays for Diagoras F.C. in the Beta Ethniki.

Poulopoulos began his playing career by signing with Kallithea F.C. in August 1994, and played two seasons for the club in the Gamma Ethniki before moving to Athinaikos F.C. in July 1996. He played for Athinaikos in the Alpha Ethniki and Beta Ethniki as the club were relegated and then promoted during his tenure. Poulopoulos has played since for Proodeftiki F.C. and Ionikos F.C. in the Alpha Ethniki.

References

External links
Profile at Insports.gr

1975 births
Living people
Greek footballers
Kallithea F.C. players
Athinaikos F.C. players
Ionikos F.C. players
Proodeftiki F.C. players
Association football defenders